Francesco Virdis (born 16 January 1985) is an Italian footballer who plays as a forward for Asti Calcio.

Career

Sampdoria and early career
Virdis started his career at Sampdoria before being loaned to a whole host of Italian lower league clubs, the most recent of which, Savona, he joined on 10 July 2018.

Virdis became a free agent and joined a Serie D club. He re-birthed with 22 goals.

Journeyman in Lega Pro
On 19 July 2012 Serie A club Chievo signed Virdis as a free agent and re-sold half of the registration rights to Savona for a peppercorn of €500. In June 2013 Savona acquired Virdis outright from Chievo for another €80,000.

On 18 June 2014 he was signed by Monza. Circa January 2015 he was signed by L'Aquila. In summer 2015 he was released.

On 4 August 2015 he was re-signed by Savona in a 1-year contract.

On 9 June 2016 Virdis was signed by Lega Pro newcomer Venice. However, on 23 August he was loaned to AlbinoLeffe. AlbinoLeffe was re-admitted to Lega Pro to fill the vacancy.

References

External links
 Football.it profile 
 
 

Italian footballers
U.C. Sampdoria players
S.S. Chieti Calcio players
A.C. Cesena players
Modena F.C. players
Ravenna F.C. players
Delfino Pescara 1936 players
A.C. Legnano players
A.S.D. Città di Foligno 1928 players
F.C. Südtirol players
Savona F.B.C. players
Serie B players
Serie C players
Serie D players
Association football forwards
People from Ozieri
1985 births
Living people
Footballers from Sardinia